Race is an Indian action crime film series produced by Ramesh S. Taurani and Kumar S. Taurani under the banner of Tips Industries. The series was written by Kiran Kotrial, Shiraz Ahmed, Anurag Prapanna and Jitendra Parmar, which stars Anil Kapoor and Saif Ali Khan as recurring roles for first 2 films, Race and Race 2 are directed by Abbas–Mustan. The third film, Race 3 was a sequel directed by Remo D'Souza. Kapoor returned once again, this time in a new role with Salman Khan and Bobby Deol joining the cast. Race 3 (third film) received negative reviews and didn't perform well as previous films at the box office. The first film is loosely based on the 1998 Hollywood movie Goodbye Lover.

Overview

Race (2008)

A voice-over by Inspector Robert “RD” D’Costa introduces the four main characters: Ranvir "Ronny" Singh, an NRI Businessman, Who runs a Successful Race Business, which he inherited from his father. His younger brother Rajiv Singh who mooches off of Ronny and is an alcoholic. Ronny is dating an upcoming model Sonia, while his personal assistant Sophia appears to be secretly in love with him. Ronny is also involved in an intense competition with a rival horse-owner Kabir. The film opens with a murder plot involving a car accident which Ronny narrowly survives. When Ronny loses money in a race because his jockey had been bribed by Kabir, Ronny plants a bomb in the jockey's car and kills him, showing Ronny to be a ruthless businessman. Later, Ronny also destroys Kabir when the latter offers him money to buy his business, which is in debt.

In a drunken stupor, Rajiv confesses to Ronny that he likes Sonia and that he would quit drinking if he could spend his life with a woman like her. Ronny immediately stops dating Sonia so that Rajiv can have her. Rajiv and Sonia begin dating and appear happy until, in a twist, Rajiv reveals he knows of Sonia's shady past and has a plan to use Sonia to his advantage. Rajiv reveals that his father had secured identical life-insurance policies for huge sums on each of the sons. He explains that he wants to kill Ronny in what would appear to be an accident and inherit $100 million in insurance payments and wants Sonia to play along. Sonia agrees to help in exchange for $20 million. They pretend to get married, and Rajiv ignores Sonia in this fake-marriage while continuing to play an alcoholic. As per his instructions, Sonia seduces Ronny, who confesses he loved her all along. Rajiv reveals the rest of his plan: to threaten to commit suicide in response to Sonia and Ronny's affair by leaping off a tall building, have Ronny appear on the terrace, and get Sonia to push Ronny off. However, it turns out Ronny was aware of the plan all along as Sonia had been keeping him updated, having always been in league with him. They then plan to apparently kill Rajiv, using his own plan against him.

Things go according to plan, but Sonia double-crosses Ronny and pushes him off, saying she loved him, but the money was more important. Inspector RD appears at this point to investigate the death, accompanied by his idiotic assistant Mini. Upon his arrival, he immediately suspects foul-play in the death. During his investigation, Ronny's assistant Sophia reveals that she was married to Ronny and produces a legitimate marriage certificate. Sonia is shocked that their plan has been thwarted as Sophia is now the heir to the insurance money. In another twist, Sophia was in on the plan all along and is Rajiv's secret collaborator. Rajiv plans to bump off Sonia after he and Sophia get the insurance money. However, RD figures out during his investigation that Sophia and Rajiv had faked her marriage with Ranvir and that he had been tricked into signing the marriage certificate. RD confronts Rajiv about this and agrees to remain silent about it in exchange for $25 million.

Rajiv hires the same hitman who had attempted to murder Ronny at the beginning to kill Sonia, revealing that he had been behind the first murder attempt, too. Sonia is lured into following Rajiv and Sophia to a parking lot, where the hitman attacks her.  Just as the hitman is about to kill her, Ronny reappears and rescues her, killing the hitman in the process.

Later, when Rajiv and Sophia plan to celebrate, Ronny appears and confronts them. He explains that he had overheard Rajiv discussing the failed murder attempt with the hitman and had been playing along the whole time so he could get the insurance money from his own fake-death along with the insurance money from killing Rajiv. Discovering that Rajiv's hatred towards him as a step brother was his main reason for doing this, he allows Rajiv one last chance to win by agreeing to a car race. Ranvir shows up to the race in a sports car, whilst Rajiv doesn't. When Rajiv protests, he switches cars with Ranvir. This turns out to be a trick as Rajiv had tampered with the brakes on his own car. Ronny, in turn, lies to Rajiv, claiming he had planted a bomb in his car, similar to the one that killed the jockey, and that Ranveer will Blow The Bomb if Rajiv ever slowed down. This causes Rajiv to crash into a petroleum tank, killing him and Sophia, who had been riding with him. Ronny narrowly escapes death himself. Ronny then says that there was no bomb in the car, and that Rajiv had "killed himself".

In the end, Ronny collects the insurance money from Rajiv and Sophia's death, along with the money from his own fake-death. Upon fleeing the city, he is stopped by Inspector RD, who had been revealed as Ranveer's childhood friends, too, and had helped Ronny fake his death and get the insurance money. Inspector RD takes his $25 million, only to find a bomb in the bag along with the money. The bomb does not detonate, and Ronny reveals that it was a mere precaution to see if RD would try to betray him and take all the money. Ranvir rewards RD for his relative honesty by allowing him to live, and the two drive off in opposite directions while RD hopes to never meet him again.

Race 2 (2013)

The film startes with a killer kill his target by Shooting a Lamborghini car's fuel tank. After some years,

robbery takes place, and European printing plates are stolen. Businessman Ranvir Singh sees this news on TV and decides to take advantage of this to get revenge for a past matter. Ranveer cheats Vikram Thapar by pretending to have stolen the Euro printing plates, and his plan is successful. He cheated Thapar so badly that he is divested of the five casinos that he owns in Istanbul, Turkey.

This cheating is revealed to be a plan that Ranveer made a week earlier with Turkish mafia leader Armaan Malik. Ranveer was introduced to Armaan by his childhood friend, Inspector Robert D Costa alias RD and his dimwitted assistant Cherry. After the con, Ranveer gives Armaan ownership of Thapar's five casinos in exchange for 10% of the money. With this deal, Ranveer and Armaan become friends. Ranveer also romances Armaan's Sister Alina (Deepika Padukone), who is his 50% business partner in all his ventures, and spent a night with him to start their partnership.

At a party hosted by Armaan and Alina, Ranveer meets Armaan's girlfriend Omisha and sees a picture of his deceased and beloved wife Sonia in her wallet. He charms her through matches of archery and fencing, where he cuts her dresses without her knowledge and walks away without watching her nudity. Ranveer then tells Armaan of a deal that will get them endless money. Armaan agrees to the plan.

Later, Ranveer reveals to RD that he is not planning to make Armaan rich, but he is actually planning to Bankrupt Armaan so badly that he will lose all his money and be forced to become a beggar on the streets, because Armaan is the main killer of Sonia. Armaan's assassin killed Sonia (Who is Pregnant) while they are going to see Sonia's sister Tania. He vows that until Armaan is ruined, he will not do Sonia's final rites. Ranveer then establishes contact with Omisha, who tells him that she is Sonia's sister Tanya and she too wants revenge. Omisha agrees to help Ranvir in his plan. However, right after Ranveer leaves, Armaan shows up at Omisha's apartment, where it is revealed that she is not actually Sonia's sister, but she is actually working for Armaan. Ranveer, however, does not know this and still believes that she is Sonia's sister.

After this, Ranveer shows RD and Cherry that his plan is to steal the Shroud of Turin. Ranveer will steal the Shroud himself, but will tell Armaan that he is getting someone else to do it. That person will ask for 15 billion Euros from Armaan, which Ranveer will secretly take. After that, he will get away with the Shroud and all of Armaan's money. RD is afraid of Armaan and therefore betrays Ranveer. RD tells Armaan all of Ranveer's plans. Armaan then tells RD to give Ranveer whatever help he needs, but RD will still be on Armaan's side. At the celebration, Aleena poison Ranveer's glass, and he died, and Omisha, Aleena, and Armaan traveled in his private jet, but Armaan is really Betraying Aleena. But, Ranveer Comes to the scene and reveals that no one is Betraying Him, but Armaan Had been betrayed by Everyone except Omisha. (RD, Cherry, Aleena, Ranveer, and Godfather Anza where Betraying Armaan). After a long fight in the malfunctioning private jet. Everyone Escapes. Armaan Borrow 15 Billion From Godfather Anza, But Armaan Realised That his Savings and Bearer Bonds where fake. So Anza takes everything from Armaan including His Crime Syndicate, Cars, Mansion, Yacht, Private Jet, Casinos, Savings, Fraud Businesses and Omisha Left Him. Armaan is now Bankrupted.

Ranveer lays flowers on Sonia's grave as Alina watches on. They then meet up with RD and Cherry, and Ranveer gives RD 10% of the money they made from ruining Armaan. There, Ranveer reveals that the Shroud was never even stolen from the Church of Turin because it was too holy to be sold in the underworld market. RD then tells Alina that he never trusted her even though Ranveer trusted her fully. Ranveer reveals that, after everyone left the ruins of Antalya, Alina came back to take Ranveer to the jet. Then, they reveal how Alina switched the real money with the fake money while Ranveer and Armaan were fighting in the jet. RD then says that he does not want to risk his life again and makes Ranveer promise to never meet him again. Ranveer shakes on the promise but then warns RD that promises are made to be broken. RD and Cherry then leave in one small aircraft, while Ranveer and Alina leave in another.

Race 3 (2018)

The story starts with Shamsher Singh, who runs a big mafia empire in the Middle East with arms and narcotics. Sikander Singh is his adopted son, while Sanjana and Suraj are his twin children. Yash is the man Friday in the Shamsher Singh empire and is a close confidante of Sikander. They all live together as one family in the Middle East. One day, their family lawyer comes and meets Shamsher, and they discuss with Sanjana and Suraj as they are now 25 years old about their will. Shamsher says will have been divided among his 3 children; 50% for Sikander  and 25% each for Sanjana and Suraj. Rana Vijay is the business rival of Shamsher. This causes friction in the family, and Sanjana and Suraj to start plotting against Sikander.
Meanwhile, Sikander and Yash revealed that they are in love. At the party, it was revealed that they are in love with the same girl Jessica. This creates a misunderstanding between Yash and Sikander. Then Sikander clears all and tells Yash that it is a plan of Suraj and Sanjana to create misunderstanding between them. They also form a plan against Suraj and Sanjana. According to the plan, Yash expressed his anger upon Sikander and joined hands with Sanjana and Siraj. Shamsher then gives a task to Suraj, Sanjana, Yash, and Sikander. The task is that, they have to steal the hard drive from a bank in Colombia where the Indian politician's illegitimate relationships videos were captured. Shamsher wanted to blackmail the politicians with the videos. They all made a plan and stole the hard drive. But Sikander was arrested for stealing. Later it was revealed that it was Sanjana and Suraj's plan, and Yash was also betraying Sikander. Yash also made a fake relationship  with Sanjana. Later, Sikander somehow escaped from the police with the help of Jessica. Later, Shamsher and Sikander lock the deal and fix a meeting with the politicians in a countryside camp. Before reaching to the camp, Sikander's car is blasted. The story takes a twist when it was revealed that Shamsher wanted to kill Sikandar. In the camp, through a video of Sikander's mother, it was revealed that Shamsher is not Suraj and Sanjana's biological father, and it is also revealed that Sikander, Suraj, and Sanjana are siblings. Shamsher announced that Yash is his son. Then Sikander suddenly reappears and tells Shamsher that he knew the truth of Shamsher since ten years with the help of Raghu Chacha. After this, a fight ensures, and Jessica is revealed to be an Interpol agent. After a fight, Sikander nearly kills Yash but tries to give him another chance. Yash was devoted to Shamsher and allowed the police to arrest him. Shamsher and Yash are arrested. It was shown that Shamsher was bribing a police officer. Sikander then announces that the race is not over yet.

Race 4 (TBA) 

Producer Ramesh S. Taurani hinted that Race 4 might happen. However, Remo D'Souza will not return as the director. In 2018, it was reported that Salman Khan will return for the sequel.

Principal cast

Crew

Release and revenue

References 

Indian thriller films
Indian action thriller films
Indian action films